Taking Over may refer to:

 "Taking Over" (Overkill album), 1987
 "Taking Over" (Sizzla album) or the title song, 2001
 "Taking Over" (EP), by the King Blues, or the title song, 2007
 "Taking Over", a 2008 one-man show by Danny Hoch
 "Taking Over", an album by Astrid Bryan, 2009
 "Taking Over" (song), by Miles Kane, 2013
 "Taking Over", a Jme song from his 2015 album Integrity>

See also
 Takeover (disambiguation)
 Taking Over Me (disambiguation)